Hasbro Family Game Night is a series of video games that adapt board games manufactured by Hasbro.

Games

Hasbro Family Game Night (2008)

Hasbro Family Game Night is the first installment of its eponymous game series, published by Electronic Arts. It is a mini-game collection consisting of six Hasbro board games - Battleship, Boggle, Connect Four, Sorry!, Sorry! Sliders and Yahtzee. The games all have traditional versions as well as "advanced" variants exclusive to the Family Game Night package. The mini-game collection is hosted by Mr. Potato Head.

Game Night was initially released on Wii and PlayStation 2 in late 2008, with ports to the PS3, Xbox 360 and Nintendo DS the following year. The Xbox 360 version was first released on Xbox Live Arcade on March 18, 2009 as a free hub application, with the individual games available for separate purchase at the time. The Xbox 360 port eventually saw a physical release, plus a digital localization for Japan in November of that year. In North America, the Xbox 360 version includes Scrabble along with the previous six games.

The PS3 port was released on October 29, only in North America and Europe, but only in a digital format that can be purchased and downloaded from the PlayStation Store.  This release features the main six games, with the North American version also featuring Scrabble, and is presented in widescreen format with PlayStation Network support.

Ahead of the digital PS3 port and the physical Xbox 360 port's releases, Electronic Arts announced that the game will receive a sequel in October that would exclusively target Nintendo platforms (the Wii and DS). The sequel's planned Nintendo DS version instead became a port of the first game, adapting two games from each of the first two installments (Battleship and Connect Four from the former and Operation and Bop It! from the latter). While the port was released on the same day as the sequel, a PC version replaced its planned DS version.

Hasbro Family Game Night 2 (2009)
Hasbro Family Game Night 2 was released in 2009 for Microsoft Windows and Wii,   with the former replacing a planned DS version that was repurposed. Both versions feature the games Operation and Pictureka!, while the Wii version has Connect 4x4, Jenga and Bop It! and the PC version has The Game of Life, Monopoly, Clue and Yahtzee.  Despite this installment being available on only two platforms, three select games from the Wii version (Pictureka!, Jenga and Connect 4x4) were made available as downloadable content for the PS3 and Xbox 360 versions of the first game on June 23, 2010, just months before a new sequel, Hasbro Family Game Night 3, was released.

Hasbro Family Game Night 3 (2010)
Hasbro Family Game Night 3 was released on October 26, 2010 for the PlayStation 3, Wii and Xbox 360. This installment adapts five games: The Game of Life, Cluedo, Twister, Mouse Trap and Yahtzee Hands Down.

Hasbro Family Game Night 4: The Game Show (2011)
Hasbro Family Game Night 4: The Game Show is a video game in the Family Game Night series, released for PlayStation 3, Wii and Xbox 360 in late 2011. The PS3 and Xbox 360 versions support motion controllers (PlayStation Move and Kinect), which are required in the Wii version, played with just a Wii Remote, like in prior installments.

As this installment is closely based on the series' TV game show adaptation on the Hub Network, all of the commentary is voiced by Todd Newton, its host. Unlike past games, an online mode is not included in the game, due to the game being branded as a $40 budget title and thus ineligible to be included on EA's online pass.

The game adapts several Game Show-enhanced variants of Hasbro board games: Bop It! Boptagon, Connect 4 Basketball, Scrabble Flash, Sorry! Sliders and Yahtzee Bowling.

Despite being part of the first season of the TV series this installment is based on, Guess Who?, Cranium, Bounce & Boogie Boggle, Operation Relay, Twister Lights Out and Guesstures Freefall are not present on this videogame simulator

Hasbro Family Fun Pack and Hasbro Game Night
In 2013, Ubisoft acquired the license to develop console video games based on Hasbro board games from Electronic Arts, effectively ending EA's original Hasbro Family Game Night series. With this new license, Ubisoft developed and released two games that follow up on the original series, Hasbro Family Fun Pack and Hasbro Game Night, with the former being released in 2015 for the PlayStation 4 and Xbox One, while the latter was released for the Nintendo Switch in 2018. Both games adapt Trivial Pursuit LIVE, Monopoly Plus and Risk and are available in North America and Europe, with the former also being available in Australia and including the game Scrabble.

Reception

Hasbro Family Game Night (2008)
The Wii version of the game received mixed reviews from critics. The review aggregator site GameRankings has an average score of 64% for the Wii version, based on 11 reviews. IGN rated it as 7 out of 10 ("Decent"), and said that control and interpretation issues cause problems for some of the games. Games Master UK magazine said: "Overall, this does everything you'd want it to (and no more)". IT Reviews concluded about the Xbox 360 version: "We would pass on Battleship, which just didn't hold our attention and had fairly weak variants. Connect 4 is worth a pop, though, with alternative play modes that really bring the game to life, and Yahtzee is certainly a little gem for the asking price".

Hasbro Family Game Night 4: The Game Show (2011)
Reception of the game has been mixed to poor. The Xbox 360 and Wii versions were the highest rated versions on Gamerankings, with scores of 37% while the PS3 version was slightly below them at 35%. Push Square claimed that the game was much more fun with another person, but was still "a harsh drop off in quality compared to other Hasbro Family Game Night titles" and gave the game a 3/10. Official Xbox Magazine UK gave it a 3/10, claiming that the games were poorly represented and saying: "This casts doubt on whether Hasbro understand what makes its non-digital games good. Whatever the reasons behind FGN4 - this is reprehensible".

References

Electronic Arts franchises
Electronic Arts games
Hasbro games
Multiple-game video board games
Party video games
Scrabble software
Video game franchises
Video game franchises introduced in 2008
Video games scored by Richard Jacques
Video games developed in the United Kingdom